Qiianarteq (also known as Kianartek or Qîanarteq) is an island in the municipality of Sermersooq, Greenland.

References

Islands of Greenland
Uninhabited islands of Greenland